John Fitzgerald and Patrick Rafter were the defending champions, but Rafter chose to compete at the World Team Cup, which was held at Düsseldorf the same week. Fitzgerald teamed up with Anders Järryd and were forced to retire in their first round match against Mark Keil and Peter Nyborg.

Byron Black and Jonathan Stark won the title by defeating Libor Pimek and Vince Spadea 7–5, 6–3 in the final.

Seeds

Draw

Draw

References

External links
 Official results archive (ATP)
 Official results archive (ITF)

Bologna Outdoor
1995 ATP Tour